Soro railway station is a railway station on the South Eastern Railway network in the state of Odisha, India. It serves Soro city. Its code is SORO. It has four platforms. Passenger, Express and Superfast trains halt at Soro railway station.

Major trains

 Kalinga Utkal Express
 Sri Jagannath Express
 Dhauli Express
 East Coast Express
 Bangriposi–Bhubaneswar Superfast Express
 Santragachi–Paradeep Express
 Odisha Sampark Kranti Express
 Bhubaneswar–Howrah Jan Shatabdi Express
 Neelachal Express
 Santragachi–Tirupati Express

See also
 Balasore district

References

Railway stations in Balasore district
Kharagpur railway division